The 82nd Expeditionary Rescue Squadron (82 ERQS) is a provisional unit of the United States Air Force (USAF), assigned to the 449th Air Expeditionary Group. It has been stationed at Camp Lemonnier, Djibouti since at least 2007. The squadron is made up of pararescue personnel, mainly to conducting search and rescue, serving as US Air Forces Africa's personnel recovery liaison to United States Africa Command's Warfighter Recovery Network. Having previously used Lockheed HC-130 aircraft of another air force unit, the 81st Expeditionary Rescue Squadron,  the squadron was training jumps from United States Marine Corps Lockheed Martin KC-130J aircraft. The squadron does not operate any aircraft. As a deployed unit, the squadron's personnel come from other units of the United States Air Force, such as the 31st Rescue Squadron, members of which made up the 82nd ERQS in 2010.

Lineage
 Constituted as the 82nd Air Rescue Squadron on 12 August 1952
 Activated on 1 September 1952
 Inactivated on 21 September 1953
 Redesignated 82nd Expeditionary Rescue Squadron and converted to provisional status on 14 April 2003
 Activated at some point between 14 April 2003 and 2 September 2007

Assignments
 12th Air Rescue Group, 1 September 1952 – 21 September 1953 (attached to Twelfth Air Force, 30 October 1952 – 21 September 1953)
 Air Combat Command, to activate or inactivate at any time, 14 April 2003
 United States Air Forces in Europe, to activate or inactivate at any time, 1 October 2008
 449th Air Expeditionary Group,  – present

Stations

 Palm Beach International Airport, Florida, 1 September 1952 – 20 October 1952
 Bordeaux, France, 30 October 1952 – 21 September 1953
 Camp Lemonnier, Djibouti  – present

References 

Squadrons of the United States Air Force